Ozell Jermaine Small (born August 18, 1982) is a former American football wide receiver in the National Football League who played for the Tennessee Titans. He played college football for the Florida Gators.

References

1982 births
Living people
American football wide receivers
Tennessee Titans players
Florida Gators football players